Gerani may refer to:

 Gerani, Cyprus, village in Northern Cyprus
 Gerani, Chania, village in the municipality of Platanias, Crete, Greece
 Gerani, Rethymno, village in the municipality of Rethymno, Crete, Greece